The 2011 New York Red Bulls season was the club's seventeenth year of existence, as well as its sixteenth season in Major League Soccer, the top-flight of American soccer.

After a successful turnaround season in 2010, in which Red Bulls finished in third place overall before losing in the quarterfinals of the post-season tournament, the club started 2011 hoping to find consistency, make a deeper run in the MLS Cup Playoffs, and vie for the Supporters Shield. By season's end it was clear the club failed on all three fronts. Red Bulls were labeled the biggest underachievers in MLS after performing with a maddening inconsistency, struggling even to earn the 10th and final spot in an expanded playoff field, and falling again in the playoff quarterfinals.

Prior to the 2011 MLS season, New York Red Bulls manager Hans Backe declared that the club's goal for the season was to win the Shield, claiming that it was more of a test for the league title rather than the MLS Cup, which he called a crapshoot. As this goal drifted out of reach, Backe backtracked from his Supporters' Shield emphasis and remarkably blamed international call-ups due to the 2011 CONCACAF Gold Cup as the reason the Shield was unobtainable. New York ended the season 21 points shy of the Shield. At the conclusion of the season, Backe acknowledged that he didn't know the biennial CONCACAF tournament was being held in 2011. That lack of awareness seemed to haunt the club throughout the season, both on field and off. The average MLS regular season and playoff home attendance of the New York Red Bulls in 2011 was 20,000.

Team uniform

Month-by-Month Overview

November 2010 
On 4 November, due to the 2010 season ending with a disappointing home playoff loss to San Jose Earthquakes, the roster changes began immediately. The playoff loss marked the end of the careers for defender Mike Petke and midfielder Seth Stammler, each of whom had announced his retirement upon completion of the season.  Petke joined the Red Bulls front office in January; Stammler pursued an MBA degree at the University of Chicago.

On 22 November, the Red Bulls traded midfielder/defender Jeremy Hall to the expansion Portland Timbers in exchange for a third-round pick in the 2011 MLS SuperDraft. Two days later the 2010 MLS Expansion Draft was held but neither Portland nor fellow expansion side Vancouver Whitecaps selected an available Red Bulls player.

The coaching staff saw assistant Coach Goran Aral leave the club after one season.

Internationally, forward Juan Agudelo and defender Tim Ream each earned their first senior caps with the U.S. National Team on 17 November. Playing in Cape Town against South Africa, Ream started and played 67 minutes while Agudelo came on as a 60th-minute substitute. Agudelo then scored the game's only goal in the 85th minute, winning the match and becoming the youngest scorer in U.S. Men's Team history at 17 years, 359 days. Agudelo bested the mark previously held by Jozy Altidore, who also set the mark while a member of New York Red Bulls.

December 2010 
The departure of captain Juan Pablo Ángel was made official when Red Bulls declined his 2011 contract option and he opted to participate in the inaugural MLS Re-Entry Draft. Midfielder Luke Sassano and defender Carey Talley also elected to participate in the Re-Entry draft when their 2011 contract options were declined. On 15 December, Los Angeles Galaxy traded up in the draft order to select Ángel. On 19 January the sides agreed terms on a multi-year, Designated Player contract.

Sassano was also selected by Los Angeles Galaxy in the Re-Entry Draft but his rights were traded to Sporting Kansas City later that same day. He signed with Sporting KC on 12 January 2011. Talley was not selected and subsequently announced his retirement on 19 January 2011. Red Bulls did not select any players in the Re-Entry draft.

On 17 December, the club announced a trade with Houston Dynamo in which Red Bulls received an undisclosed amount of allocation money. In return, Houston received New York's natural third-round selection in the 2012 MLS SuperDraft and the rights to defender Hunter Freeman, whom Houston immediately signed. Red Bulls had traded Freeman to Toronto FC for the last months of the 2008 MLS season even though Freeman had already agreed a pre-contract with IK Start of the Norwegian Premier League. The trade with Toronto included a provision that Red Bulls retain Freeman's MLS rights should he return to the league.

In international duty, midfielder Dane Richards scored three goals over five games to help Jamaica win the 2010 Caribbean Cup.

January 2011 
The club was active in January 2011 with a number of players coming and going. The long-rumored acquisitions of Norwegian midfielder Jan Gunnar Solli and English forward Luke Rodgers were finalized on 26 January and 28 January, respectively. The club also signed young Brazilian midfielder Marcos Paullo, who had trialed with New York in 2010, on 30 January.

Red Bulls announced the signing of two more Homegrown players from Red Bull Academy in January: midfielder Matt Kassel and defender Šaćir Hot. Kassel and Hot joined prior Academy signings Juan Agudelo and Giorgi Chirgadze on the Red Bulls roster.

At the 13 January 2011 SuperDraft, the club selected Generation adidas forward Corey Hertzog in round one, English midfielder John Rooney (brother of English international Wayne Rooney) and defender Tyler Lassiter in round two, and defender Billy Cortes in round three. The following week, Red Bulls selected goalkeeper Jimmy Maurer and defender Teddy Schneider in the 2011 Supplemental Draft. Of the draft choices,  Hertzog and Rooney were immediately added to the club's roster as both had already signed contracts with Major League Soccer.  Lassiter, Cortes, Maurer, and Schneider were not guaranteed contracts and were invited to preseason training camp to earn a spot on the club's final roster.

On 17 January, the club announced that Jan Halvor Halvorsen had been hired as assistant coach, replacing Goran Aral.

In the final week of January, the club announced that midfielder Siniša Ubiparipović and defender Andrew Boyens would not be returning to the club in 2011. Boyens signed with Chivas USA in early February.

The club announced its preseason schedule would include training stints in Cancún, Guadalajara, Fort Lauderdale, and Arizona. The list of preseason opponents included Mexico's Chivas, D2 side Miami FC, plus Chicago Fire, Sporting Kansas City, and FC Dallas of MLS.

February 
On 1 February, MLS announced that Red Bull Arena would host the 2011 MLS All-Star Game on 27 July when the MLS All-Stars would take on perennial Premier League power Manchester United for the second consecutive season.

On 9 February, the preseason schedule kicked off when the Red Bulls defeated Mexican side Atlante F.C. 0–0 (4–3 penalties) in Cancún. Preseason continued with very little to report in roster changes or injuries. The club brought in a few trialists, most notably Teemu Tainio, and late in the month released third-round SuperDraft pick Billy Cortes.

A major shake-up occurred on 28 February when Red Bulls fired longtime assistant coaches Richie Williams and Des McAleenan. Williams was a popular figure among club supporters and guided the club as caretaker manager in two different seasons. His MLS experience had been credited with helping Sporting Director Erik Solér and Head Coach Hans Backe adjust to the peculiarities of the league, such as the MLS SuperDraft. Williams had played the 2001 and 2003 seasons for the club before returning as assistant coach in 2006. McAleenan had been goalkeeping coach since 2002, a remarkable run given the ownership change and constant turnover around him in the coaching and front office ranks.

March 
The club met the 1 March official MLS roster compliance of 30 players by waiving two second-year players, forward Conor Chinn and midfielder Irving Garcia. While neither made an impact during the 2010 regular season, each performed well as part of the "Baby Bulls" squad in the 2010 U.S. Open Cup.

A few injuries did hit the squad as preseason came to an end. Strikers Luke Rodgers and Juan Agudelo battled nagging injuries which limited their participation in exhibition matches. The club announced on 8 March that defender Chris Albright had undergone knee surgery and would miss 4–6 weeks. On 9 March, Red Bulls announced the signings of two trialists, midfielder/defender Teemu Tainio and defender Stephen Keel. Tainio was penciled in for a starting role while Keel was signed to provide defensive depth from the bench.

The club released Giorgi Chirgadze, its first ever homegrown player signing, on 15 March. Though Chirgadze signed with the club in 2009 he never did appear in a league match with Red Bulls.

The 2011 Major League Soccer season officially kicked off for Red Bulls when the club hosted Seattle Sounders FC on 19 March. New York dominated possession 63%-37% and out-shot Seattle 13-8 en route to a 1-0 victory. The lone goal was scored in the 70th minute by Juan Agudelo off a long ball by MLS debutante Teemu Tainio.

Two days later the club announced it had waived forward Salou Ibrahim which was a bit surprising given New York's thin ranks at forward. Ibrahim's release left only four forwards on the roster: Juan Agudelo, Thierry Henry, Luke Rodgers, and Corey Hertzog. Salou spent the 2010 season with Red Bulls, scoring 3 goals in 19 league games (8 starts).

Red Bulls signed second-round SuperDraft choice Tyler Lassiter on 23 March. The rookie defender earned much praise from the club in pre-season, with coach Hans Backe stating, "The way he started this preseason, he looks better in February than Tim Ream did when he arrived." Ream went on to be an MLS Rookie of the Year finalist. The club also signed Alex Horwath as the third-string goalkeeper on 25 March. Horwath was immediately placed into action on 26 March at Columbus Crew due to an injury to starting goalkeeper Greg Sutton and the international call-up of backup keeper Bouna Coundoul. Horwath and a lineup sprinkled with reserves earned a point with a 0-0 draw. Injuries kept Sutton and Thierry Henry from traveling with the club, while international duty removed Coundoul, Juan Agudelo, Tim Ream, Dane Richards, and Rafael Marquez from the Red Bulls lineup. In addition to Horwath, forward Luke Rodgers made his Major League Soccer debut, backups Carlos Mendes and Stephen Keel started in central defense, and backup Danleigh Borman started in midfield. Rookie Corey Hertzog made his MLS debut as a late substitute.

Several Red Bulls players enjoyed productive spells with their national sides during the late March international window. Forward Juan Agudelo came on as a second-half substitute and scored the tying goal for the United States in its 1-1 draw with Argentina on 26 March. Three days later, Agudelo and defender Tim Ream went the full 90 for the U.S. in its 1-0 loss to Paraguay. Midfielder Dane Richards scored two goals for Jamaica in a 3-2 victory over El Salvador on 29 March while defender Rafael Marquez earned his 100th cap for Mexico when he captained El Tri to a victory over Paraguay on 26 March.

MLS Results for March: 1 victory, 1 draw, 0 losses
MLS Results Season-to-Date: 1 victory, 1 draw, 0 losses; 4 points, 7th overall through 2 matches

April 
The month started off with a blockbuster trade to acquire the #10 that Red Bull fans have long wanted. On 1 April, the club pulled the trigger and sent second-year midfielder Tony Tchani, defender Danleigh Borman, and a first-round pick in the 2012 MLS SuperDraft to Toronto FC in exchange for midfielder Dwayne De Rosario. The deal provided New York with its most dangerous midfield playmaker since Amado Guevara left the squad in 2006. The trade of De Rosario by his hometown side was predicated on his demand for a new contract. The money issue was solved by Red Bulls with De Rosario's agent stating, "We have a very satisfactory agreement with NY and Dwayne can't wait to get on the field for them. Press reports also stated that Toronto would pay "a significant amount" of De Rosario's salary for 2011 and that De Rosario possesses a U.S. green card so he would not occupy an international roster slot for New York.

De Rosario debuted for New York as a second-half substitute versus Houston on 2 April. His assist to Dane Richards proved the lone New York goal in a 1-1 draw. One week later, Red Bulls fell at Philadelphia Union by a 1-0 score, the lone goal a result of a horrible gaffe by defender Tim Ream.

Red Bulls then dominated the next two matches, winning by scorelines of 3-0 over San Jose Earthquakes and 4-0 at D.C. United. Luke Rodgers was named MLS Player of the Week for his 2-goal, 1 assist performance against San Jose. The thrashing of rivals D.C. United was especially sweet for Red Bull fans, marking New York's first 4-goal margin of victory on the road since 1996 and the largest ever margin of victory against DC. New York finished the month with a 1-0 victory over Sporting Kansas City with Rodgers again supplying the goal, giving him 3 goals in 3 matches. Likewise, strike partner Thierry Henry closed the month with a tally of 4 goals in 4 matches.

The club signed Supplemental Draft pick Teddy Schneider on 12 April to provide defensive cover. Two days later Red Bulls added Todd Hoffard as goalkeeping coach. Sporting Director Erik Solér stated, "Todd has a great deal of experience in American soccer and will be a valuable asset to our coaching squad."

Red Bulls also announced on 28 April that the club would go to London in late July to participate in the Emirates Cup, hosted by English Premier League side Arsenal. Red Bulls would become the first MLS club to participate in the tournament. It was widely viewed that the invitation came due to the storied past of New York Designated Player Thierry Henry with Arsenal. Opponents were announced as Paris Saint-Germain and Arsenal.MLS Results for April: 3 victories, 1 draw, 1 lossMLS Results Season-to-Date: 4 victories, 2 draws, 1 loss; 14 points, 2nd overall through 7 matches

 May 
7 May 2011 witnessed the most expensive match in MLS history as New York traveled to play at Los Angeles Galaxy. For the first time ever five designated players were on the field for a league match: Thierry Henry and Rafa Marquez for Red Bulls and Landon Donovan, David Beckham, and former Red Bull Juan Pablo Ángel for Los Angeles. The game did not disappoint. Henry's early goal was matched by a Donovan score just before half. Tim Ream made an outstanding goal-line clearance, winning MLS Save of the Week, to thwart a second Donovan scoring chance before the break. The match ended a 1-1 draw, a fair result for Red Bulls against a quality opponent.

From Los Angeles, the club traveled cross-continent to Montreal for a mid-week friendly versus Montreal Impact. The timing of the match, which New York lost 1-0, left fans perplexed as Red Bulls had an upcoming match versus Chivas USA in just 4 days time. Sure enough, Red Bulls lost at home to Chivas USA in a driving rain by a 3-2 scoreline. Two Goats' goals came from set pieces, which quickly emerged as Red Bulls largest defensive failing for the rest of the season.

The remaining three matches of May all resulted in draws: at Houston 2-2, home to Colorado 2-2, and at Vancouver 1-1.

Near month's end, five players were called to international duty for the 2011 CONCACAF Gold Cup: Juan Agudelo and Tim Ream for the United States, Rafa Marquez for Mexico, Dane Richards for Jamaica, and Dwayne De Rosario for Canada. New York faced the prospect of losing the services of these 5 players for the entire month of June.
 MLS Results for May: 0 victories, 4 draws, 1 lossMLS Results Season-to-Date: 4 victories, 6 draws, 2 losses; 18 points, 5th overall through 12 matches

 June 
The loss of the regulars was keenly felt during a 1-1 draw at Columbus on 4 June. A makeshift squad including Mehdi Ballouchy, Stephen Keel, Carlos Mendes, Austin da Luz, and substitute Matt Kassel conceded a 92nd-minute goal to drop 2 points. This match exposed the lack of depth on the squad, a shortcoming exacerbated by the reluctance of Hans Backe to give his younger players any meaningful minutes. The lack of depth, the unwillingness to use the bench, and consistently poor set piece defending became the defining points of the 2011 Red Bulls.

On 10 June, Red Bulls saw their first victory in over a month when they defeated New England 2–1 at Red Bull Arena. GK Greg Sutton played hero as he saved a penalty in the 33rd minute.

Off the field, the club announced on 10 June that Chris Heck, a former National Basketball Association executive, would take over business operations from Erik Stover, who had overseen the construction of Red Bull Arena. As the season progressed, Heck expanded marketing and promotions geared more toward casual fans and families, including the use of Groupon.

The club signed rookie defender Mike Jones on 12 June. Jones was released earlier in the season by Sporting Kansas City.

On 19 June, Red Bulls made a fighting comeback against Portland Timbers to draw 3–3. After being down 3–1 and with less than 20 minutes to play, Henry started the comeback with a goal in the 73rd minute and De Rosario sealed the draw with a penalty goal in extra time by converting the spot kick in the 96th minute.

From Portland, Red Bulls traveled to Seattle Sounders FC and left with a tough 4–2 loss in front of a crowd of over 46,000. Seattle forward Roger Levesque came off the bench to score two goals within 10 minutes to assure his side's victory. GK Greg Sutton this time played goat, conceding one goal while arguing with the referee and another after being stripped of possession under little pressure. Also, New York played without Henry after the captain was controversially red carded late in the Portland match.

The road warrior segment of the schedule continued with a 26 June match at Chicago Fire. The match ended in a 1–1 draw with Joel Lindpere scoring the Red Bulls goal.

Internationally, the Gold Cup concluded with Rafa Marquez's Mexico squad beating Tim Ream and Juan Agudelo's United States side in the final on 25 June.

On 28 June, the first New York Derby was contested when Red Bulls faced F.C. New York in the third round of the 2011 U.S. Open Cup. The match ended with a 2–1 Red Bulls victory at Red Bull Arena. Rookies Corey Hertzog and John Rooney were the Red Bull goal scorers.

The shock of the month - if not the season - was provided on 27 June when the club announced it traded Dwayne De Rosario to rivals D.C. United for midfielder Dax McCarty. Red Bulls General Manager and Sporting Director Erik Soler said "Dax is an exciting young player who will immediately add his dynamic style of play to our midfield," and "he is an excellent two-way player who will contribute both to our defense and to our attack for seasons to come." The trading of perennial All Star De Rosario after only three months with New York stunned fans and media alike. That the club received only McCarty, who was left exposed in the 2010 MLS Expansion Draft just months earlier and had since fallen out of favor with his new D.C. club, was difficult to understand as captured in this actual column title from a Washington Post article: D.C. United trades McCarty for De Rosario, New York watches, giggles. The bewildering trade left Red Bull fans questioning the competence of General Manager Erik Soler. With only one league victory in the past two months, the abilities of Coach Hans Backe also became a growing subject of consternation.MLS Results for June: 1 victory, 3 draws, 1 lossMLS Results Season-to-Date: 5 victories, 9 draws, 3 losses; 24 points, 6th overall through 17 matches

 July 
Red Bulls opened July in similar fashion as June, with a 2-2 draw against San Jose Earthquakes at Stanford Stadium. Joel Lindpere saved the point for New York with his first brace of the season. He earned MLS Player of the Week for his performance.

On 6 July, the team emphatically beat Toronto 5–0 with goals from Henry, Rodgers, Lindpere and a brace by Agudelo. The win was the club's biggest of the season and gave hope heading into the 9 July home match against D.C. United and De Rosario. The hope was misplaced, as a De Rosario goal gave D.C. a 1–0 victory at Red Bull Arena. This match would also prove to be the last started by Luke Rodgers for two months as the striker battled plantar fasciitis.

The league announced on 10 July that forward Thierry Henry and defenders Rafa Marquez and Tim Ream were selected to the 2011 MLS All-Star Game to be held at Red Bull Arena on 27 July. Later in the month MLS Commissioner Don Garber announced that Juan Agudelo had been added to the MLS All-Star Game roster and that Joel Lindpere had been added as an inactive participant.

Another season low point was reached on 12 July when Red Bulls were eliminated from the U.S. Open Cup by a 4–0 thrashing at Chicago Fire in a quarterfinal match-up. Despite the fact that New York is the only original MLS club to never win a major trophy, team management decided that the U.S. Open Cup was not a priority and sent a squad lacking any regular starters to Chicago. Making matters worse, neither Coach Backe nor top assistant Jan Halvor Halvorsen traveled to Chicago. Instead, first-year assistant coach Mike Petke and injured player Carl Robinson were assigned to coach the squad of reserves against the Chicago starters. The ambivalence toward the Open Cup quarterfinal match infuriated Supporters Groups.

The following day, Red Bulls announced the signing of veteran German goalkeeper Frank Rost from Bundesliga club Hamburger SV. General Manager Erik Soler stated "Frank is a very experienced goalkeeper who will provide a strong presence in-between the posts for our club during our quest for a MLS title," and "we are thrilled that he has decided to join us in the middle of our campaign and look forward to his contributions for the remainder of the season." Rost became the club's third Designated Player.

The club traveled west to face Chivas USA on 16 July and came away with yet another draw, this one scoreless, in Rost's debut.

Off the field that same day, the club announced that goalkeeper Greg Sutton, made redundant with the arrival of Frank Rost, had been loaned to North American Soccer League side Montreal Impact for the remainder of the season. This marked a homecoming of sorts for Sutton, a native Canadian who spent six years with Montreal earlier in his career. The club also announced that it had acquired an international roster slot from D.C. United for future considerations. Two days later, the future considerations were confirmed as second-year midfielder Austin da Luz. Supporters were again confused by the move, this time for trading an inexpensive, capable, domestic player to rivals D.C. for an international slot that reverts to D.C. at season's end.

Coach Backe did not help his standing with the fanbase by publicly conceding his preseason goal of winning the Supporters Shield. Backe told the New York Post on 18 July: "...even if I wanted to win the Shield, but that is gone."

The downward spiral continued with a 4-1 loss at Colorado on 20 July. Three days later, Red Bulls did rescue a point from FC Dallas in a 2-2 home draw. Playing in stifling heat, Thierry Henry scored a late equalizer after Dane Richards had been sent off for his caution. That concluded league play for the month, with Red Bulls having now won 2 league matches in 3 months and having slipped to 9th place overall.

The All-Star game was held at Red Bull Arena on 27 July. Coach Backe managed the MLS squad to a 4–0 defeat at the hands of English Premier League champions Manchester United.

On 31 July, Red Bulls did manage to win a (meaningless) trophy: the 2011 Emirates Cup. After defeating Paris Saint-Germain of French Ligue 1 on 30 July by a 1–0 scoreline, Red Bulls then drew 1–1 against hosts, Arsenal of the English Premier League. Returning hero Thierry Henry was warmly received by Arsenal fans.MLS Results for July: 1 victory, 3 draws, 2 lossesMLS Results Season-to-Date: 6 victories, 12 draws, 5 losses; 30 points, 9th overall through 23 matches

 August 
The next league match was 6 August at Real Salt Lake. Red Bulls showed the effects of the long journey from England, losing badly 3–0. The loss dropped New York back to a dead even won-lost record. To make matters worse, new goalkeeper Frank Rost was removed at halftime due to an injury he suffered while sitting on the airplane on the flight from London to America.

Draws by a 2–2 scoreline followed against Chicago on 13 August and New England on 20 August, Dane Richards netting both goals in the latter game. The Chicago game featured emergency goalkeeper Chris Konopka as starter due to Rost's injury, the loan of Greg Sutton, an international call-up for Bouna Coundoul, and an apparent lack of faith by Coach Backe in third-string keeper Alex Horwath. It proved to be Konopka's only appearance of the season.

The marquee match of the month, the visit by first place Los Angeles Galaxy on 28 August, was postponed until 4 October due to Hurricane Irene.

During August, Red Bulls traded a 2013 MLS SuperDraft pick to Sporting Kansas City for midfielder Stéphane Auvray and loaned rookie defender Tyler Lassiter to North American Soccer League side Carolina RailHawks. The club also continued its shakeup of staff members, relieving athletic trainer Rick Guter of his duties following 5 years of service. A replacement was not named.

The consistent lack of victories resulted in a continued fall in the standings. At month's end, Red Bulls had fallen to 11th place through 26 rounds. For the first time all season the club was outside the playoff picture.MLS Results for August: 0 victories, 2 draws, 1 lossMLS Results Season-to-Date: 6 victories, 14 draws, 6 losses; 32 points, 11th overall through 26 matches

 September 
With 8 matches to go and fighting for the playoffs, New York could ill afford to lose a starter but they did just that when Roy Miller was injured while playing internationally for Costa Rica on 6 September. Miller missed two weeks. The club did regain the services of Luke Rodgers after 2 months out of the starting lineup.

Red Bulls hosted last place Vancouver on 10 September and earned another draw, this time 1–1. One week later Rodgers scored the only goal in a surprising 1–0 victory at Dallas. The joy of a victory was short-lived as the club returned home on 21 September and fell flat versus Salt Lake, losing 3–1. All 3 Salt Lake goals were conceded in the first 21 minutes of play.

After the Salt Lake match, Designated Player Rafa Marquez, who had been singled out recently by fans for his indifferent performance and lack of hustle, gave a scathing interview in which he denigrated his teammates, Tim Ream specifically. Among Marquez's statements were: "I think I am playing at my maximum level, and doing everything I can. I don't have, unfortunately, four defenders on my level that can help me out."; "Tim is still a young player with a lot to learn. He still has quite a lot to learn, and well, he has committed errors that are very infantile and cost us goals."; and "I think that this is a team game, and unfortunately, there isn't an equal level between perhaps (Thierry Henry) and myself, and our teammates." Despite Marquez's initial claims that he was misquoted, the interview was videotaped and posted in its entirety at a fan website. Two days later the club suspended Marquez for one match.

Red Bulls won the match that Marquez missed, beating Portland 2–0 on 24 September. This result meant that Marquez had not played in any of the four most recent Red Bulls victories or in any of the four most recent Red Bulls shutouts. The win moved the club back into playoff position, 9th overall.MLS Results for September: 2 victories, 1 draw, 1 lossMLS Results Season-to-Date: 8 victories, 15 draws, 7 losses; 39 points, 9th overall through 30 matches

 October 
Marquez returned for the 1 October match at Toronto and his impact was felt. His early second-half giveaway and failure to hustle back defensively resulted in a Toronto goal. Only a sterling late game finish by Thierry Henry allowed Red Bulls to rescue a point through a 1–1 draw.

The rescheduled home match against Los Angeles was played on 4 October. Red Bulls looked sharp and earned a 2–0 victory which placed them on the cusp of clinching a playoff spot. However, in the inconsistent manner exhibited by the club all season long, a flat New York squad next fell at Kansas City 2–0. Henry was issued a straight red card in the match, causing him to miss the final league match with the club needing a result to ensure a playoff spot.

Prior to the final match, General Manager Erik Soler told The New York Times that Coach Hans Backe would return for 2012. Soler also addressed the June trade of Dwayne De Rosario to D.C. United, deflecting blame by stating: "He didn't work out, he didn't score. He's a great player as long as he has the ball, and we already have those kinds of players here. Our problem is not scoring goals, our problem is defensive mistakes. He's not a guy who likes to play a complementary role. He didn't fit in. I'm happy for him. He's a great guy, but he wouldn't score 15 goals here. We know that Thierry Henry needs the ball, and on a smaller scale DeRo is the same. It's not our mistake. It just didn't work out."

The last league match was home to Philadelphia on 20 October. An early Dane Richards goal proved enough for a 1–0 victory that clinched the 10th and final playoff spot for Red Bulls.MLS Results for October: 2 victories, 1 draw, 1 lossMLS Results Regular Season (Final): 10 victories, 16 draws, 8 losses; 44 points, 10th overall

New York opened the postseason with a one-game Wild Card round playoff at Dallas. Goals by Joel Lindpere and Thierry Henry led Red Bulls to a surprising 2–0 win.

The victory over Dallas earned New York a two-game series with Supporters Shield winners Los Angeles Galaxy. The first match was played 30 October at Red Bull Arena. Former Red Bull Mike Magee scored the game's lone goal to win the match for Galaxy. After the match, a skirmish erupted when Marquez threw the ball at Galaxy captain Landon Donovan, hitting the American international in the foot. Nearby Galaxy player Adam Cristman took offense and confronted Marquez, who responded by punching (and missing) wildly and seemingly attempting to headbutt Cristman. Other players joined the fray, with Los Angeles midfielder Juninho landing an elbow to the face of unsuspecting Red Bulls defender Stephen Keel. Marquez inexplicably grabbed his face and flopped to the ground when other players approached, though no player was near enough to make contact with him. He and Juninho were both shown red cards for their actions, causing them to miss the return leg in Los Angeles. Two days later, the league suspended Marquez an additional two matches for: "attempting to head butt Adam Cristman, attempting to punch Adam Cristman; striking Cristman, and simulating that he had been struck in the face." The extra suspension ended Marquez's 2011 season.MLS Playoff Results: Wild Card victory over FC Dallas; trailing 1–0 in aggregate to Los Angeles Galaxy

 November 
Red Bulls faced a daunting task needing to win in Los Angeles, something no visiting club had managed all season. In the return leg on 3 November, an early Luke Rodgers goal tied the series and gave Red Bulls hope. New York carried play until midfielder Teemu Tainio was forced out with injury at 16 minutes. From there, the match turned toward Los Angeles with Galaxy finally regaining the aggregate lead on a Mike Magee goal minutes before halftime. A second-half goal by Landon Donovan cemented the series victory for Los Angeles and ended another disappointing season for New York Red Bulls.

On 9 November the club announced team awards for 2011: Most Valuable Player - Thierry Henry; Newcomer of the Year - Luke Rodgers; Defender of the Year - Jan Gunnar Solli; Humanitarian of the Year - Stephen Keel.

To add insult to injury, Dwayne De Rosario, discarded after less than three months with New York, was named 2011 Most Valuable Player of Major League Soccer.

Rafa Marquez's suspension will carry over to the first two matches of 2012.MLS Playoff Results: Conference Semifinal defeat to Los Angeles Galaxy

 Team information

 Squad At close of the 2011 season. Formation 

 International players 
The following players on the club have received international call-ups during the season or within the previous year:

 Player movement 

 Transfers 

 In 

 Out 

 Loans 

 In 

 Out 

 Player statistics 

Statistics for MLS league matches through October 21, 2011.* = No longer with the club.** = Goals total includes 2 own goals scored by opposition.''

Goalkeeper statistics

Statistics for MLS league matches through October 21, 2011.

Club staff

Competitions

Overall

Standings

Overall standings

Results summary

Results by rounds

Match results

Pre-season 
Kickoff times are in EST.

Major League Soccer 
Kickoff times are in EDT.

MLS Cup Playoffs

Wild Card Round

Conference Semi-finals

Friendlies

2011 Emirates Cup

U.S. Open Cup

MLS Reserve League 
Kickoff times are in EDT.

Pre-season

Friendlies

Season

Recognition

MLS Player of the Week

MLS Goal of the Week

MLS Save of the Week

MLS All-Stars 2011

Miscellany

Allocation ranking 
New York did not use its spot in the MLS Allocation Ranking during the 2011 season. The allocation ranking is the mechanism used to determine which MLS club has first priority to acquire a U.S. National Team player who signs with MLS after playing abroad, or a former MLS player who returns to the league after having gone to a club abroad for a transfer fee. A ranking can be traded, provided that part of the compensation received in return is another club's ranking.

International roster spots 
It is believed that New York has 12 international roster spots. Each club in Major League Soccer is allocated 8 international roster spots, which can be traded. New York acquired its first additional spot from San Jose Earthquakes on 2 March 2009. Press reports did not indicate if or when this roster spot was to revert to San Jose. New York acquired a second additional spot from Houston Dynamo on 17 March 2009. It is not known if or when this roster spot is to revert to Houston. The club also acquired a spot from Colorado Rapids on 14 September 2010 in the Macoumba Kandji trade. The trade of this spot was not included in the press release and it is not known when this spot reverts to Colorado. The club acquired a fourth additional international spot from D.C. United on 16 July 2011. This spot will return to D.C. after the 2011 season.

There is no limit on the number of international slots on each club's roster. The remaining roster slots must belong to domestic players. For clubs based in the United States, a domestic player is either a U.S. citizen, a permanent resident (green card holder) or the holder of other special status (e.g., refugee or asylum status).

Future draft pick trades 
Future picks acquired: None.
Future picks traded: 2012 SuperDraft Round 1 pick traded to Toronto FC; 2012 Supplemental Draft Round 1 pick traded to Houston Dynamo; 2013 SuperDraft Round 2 pick traded to Sporting Kansas City.

References 

New York Red Bulls seasons
New York Red Bulls
New York Red Bulls
Red bulls